Frignano is a comune (municipality) in the Province of Caserta in the Italian region Campania, located about  northwest of Naples and about  southwest of Caserta.

Frignano borders the following municipalities: Aversa, Casaluce, San Marcellino, San Tammaro, Villa di Briano.

References

Cities and towns in Campania